The Immaculate Conception Metropolitan Cathedral (Spanish: Catedral Metropolitana de la Inmaculada Concepción) commonly called the Roxas Cathedral, is a Catholic church in the city of Roxas, Capiz, in central Philippines. It is the seat of the Roman Catholic Archdiocese of Capiz.

The parish church was elevated into a cathedral. following the creation of the Diocese of Capiz on January 27, 1951.  However, the diocese retained the old name of Capiz as it predates the change of the city name to Roxas on April 11, 1951.

History

The church and parish of Roxas City (then named as Municipality of Capiz) is one of the oldest in Panay Island, having been founded by Augustinian missionaries in 1707.

The cathedral, as it was in its first inception, is in the historic center of Roxas City and fronts the city plaza, opposite the Panay River and the Capiz Bridge.

The current structure was built in 1827. In 1898, it was within the diocese of Jaro, being run by secular priests. Loctugan and Ivisan were Capiz's visitas.  From 1918 to 1920, Gabriel Reyes, (who became Bishop of Cebu in 1932 and Archbishop of Manila in 1949) served as its parish priest.
The cathedral had undergone restoration and reconstruction works in 1954.

In the November 28, 2020 consistory, Archbishop Jose Fuerte Advincula became the first archbishop of Capiz to be created as a cardinal but received his red biretta and ring from Archbishop Charles John Brown, the Apostolic Nuncio to the Philippines, only on June 18, 2021, at the cathedral. Before this, he was named the 33rd Archbishop of Manila on March 15, 2021.

See also
Panay Church

References

External links
 Facebook page 

Buildings and structures in Roxas, Capiz
Spanish Colonial architecture in the Philippines
Roman Catholic cathedrals in the Philippines
1707 establishments in the Spanish Empire
19th-century Roman Catholic church buildings in the Philippines
20th-century Roman Catholic church buildings in the Philippines
Churches in Capiz